Oldroyd is a surname. Notable people with the surname include:

Brad Oldroyd (born 1973), Australian cricketer
Darren Oldroyd (born 1966), English former footballer
David R. Oldroyd (1936–2014), English-Australian historian of science
Edgar Oldroyd (1888–1964), English cricketer
Eleanor Oldroyd (born 1962), English sports broadcaster
George Oldroyd (1887–1956), English organist and composer of Anglican church music
Giles Oldroyd, professor at the University of Cambridge working on beneficial Legume symbioses
Harold Oldroyd (1913–1978), British entomologist
Ida Shepard Oldroyd (1856–1940), American conchologist
James G. Oldroyd (1921–1982), British mathematician and rheologist
Jean Oldroyd (born 1942), British former swimmer
Liddy Oldroyd (1955–2002), English television director
Mark Oldroyd (1843–1927), British woollen manufacturer and Liberal Party politician
Rachel Oldroyd, the managing editor at the Bureau of Investigative Journalism

See also
George Oldroyd Borwick (1879–1964), Conservative Party politician in the United Kingdom
Oldroyd Island, small island northwest of Magnetic Island in the east part of Prydz Bay
Oldroyd-B model, constitutive model used to describe the flow of viscoelastic fluids
Oldroydia